The Criminal Statutes Repeal Act 1827 (7 & 8 Geo.4 c.27) was an Act of the Parliament of the United Kingdom. It was one of Peel's Acts, consolidating, repealing and replacing a large number of existing statutes.

Listed in section 1 of the Act, the provisions it abolished ranged in date from the punishment for stealing the King's venison in Henry III's 1217 Charter of the Forest to the entirety of the 1826 Stealing from Gardens Act. They were all to be abolished in England from 1 July 1827 onwards, at which date the Malicious Injuries to Property Act 1827 would instead come into effect. In all but two cases, section 2 stated that the abolition did not stretch to any part of any previous Act relating to the Post Office, the South Sea Company, the Bank of England, "any Branch of the Public Revenue", navy and army stores and other royal "Public Stores".

References
Hansard

United Kingdom Acts of Parliament 1827